Morishita is a Japanese surname. Notable people with the surname include:

, Japanese voice actress
, Japanese footballer and manager
, Japanese footballer
, Japanese motorcycle racer
, Japanese judoka
, Japanese animator
, Japanese long-distance runner
, Japanese illustrator
, Japanese swimmer
, Japanese mayor
, Japanese footballer
, Japanese footballer
, Japanese physician
, Japanese shogi player
, Japanese ballet dancer
, Japanese long-distance runner
, Filipino-Japanese actor, singer and member of Filipino boy group BGYO

See also
Morishita Station (disambiguation), multiple railway stations in Japan

Japanese-language surnames